Platytes poliopepla is a moth in the family Crambidae. It was described by Oswald Bertram Lower in 1905. It is found in Australia, where it has been recorded from Victoria.

References

Crambini
Moths described in 1905
Moths of Australia